Ray "Golden" Apollon, born Cyril Joseph, (1924–February 4, 1997) was a professional wrestler from the island of Trinidad.

Apollon studied at St. Mary's College in Trinidad and graduated with a Bachelor of Arts Honours Degree from Howard University in Washington, D.C. He traveled to France to study medicine at the Sorbonne University, to become a doctor like his father. Once in Europe, though, he became interested in wrestling and became a professional wrestler. He worked in Asia, the Middle East, Africa,  Europe, and Trinidad. He was made a Chief of Nigeria and nicknamed the "Lion King". In Kenya, he stayed at the house of the president, Jomo Kenyatta. He was known for his headbutts, particularly the "coconut butt". His students included Ted Herbert, Des the Artist, Thunderbolt Williams, and his son Fernando.

Family Life:

Ray Apollon was married to Susan Parisot, with whom he had three children; Fernando, Raymond, and Angelique. His grandchildren include Charlotte and Sophie Potter.

Championships and accomplishments
World Wrestling Council
WWC Caribbean Heavyweight Championship (1 time)

Trinidad and Tobago Wrestling Association 
 TTWA World Heavyweight Championship (1 time)
 TTWA World Tag Team Championship (1 time) - with Thunderbolt William

References

1924 births
1997 deaths
Howard University alumni
Trinidad and Tobago sportsmen
Trinidad and Tobago professional wrestlers
University of Paris alumni
Trinidad and Tobago expatriates in the United States
Trinidad and Tobago expatriates in France
Trinidad and Tobago expatriate sportspeople in Germany
Trinidad and Tobago expatriates in Kenya